John Emil Sörenson (September 15, 1889 – October 25, 1976) was a Swedish gymnast who competed in the 1920 Summer Olympics. He was the only member of the Swedish team, which participated in the gymnastics men's team, Swedish system competition in both the 1912 and 1920 Olympic games. So he was able to win the gold medal in both events and to defend his title eight years later.

References

External links
profile

1889 births
1976 deaths
Swedish male artistic gymnasts
Gymnasts at the 1912 Summer Olympics
Gymnasts at the 1920 Summer Olympics
Olympic gymnasts of Sweden
Olympic gold medalists for Sweden
Olympic medalists in gymnastics
Medalists at the 1920 Summer Olympics
Medalists at the 1912 Summer Olympics